Dolores Clara Fernández Huerta (born April 10, 1930) is an American labor leader and civil rights activist who, with Cesar Chavez, is a co-founder of the National Farmworkers Association, which later merged with the Agricultural Workers Organizing Committee to become the United Farm Workers (UFW). Huerta helped organize the Delano grape strike in 1965 in California and was the lead negotiator in the workers' contract that was created after the strike.

Huerta has received numerous awards for her community service and advocacy for workers', immigrants', and women's rights, including the Eugene V. Debs Foundation Outstanding American Award, the United States Presidential Eleanor Roosevelt Award for Human Rights and the Presidential Medal of Freedom. She was the first Latina inducted into the National Women's Hall of Fame, in 1993.

Huerta is the originator of the phrase "Sí, se puede". As a role model to many in the Latino community, Huerta is the subject of many corridos (Mexican or Mexican-American ballads) and murals.

In California, April 10 is Dolores Huerta Day.

Early life
Dolores Huerta was born on April 10, 1930, in the mining town of Dawson, New Mexico. She is the second child and only daughter of Juan Fernández and Alicia Chávez. Juan Fernández was born in Dawson to a Mexican immigrant family and worked as a coal miner. Later, he joined the migrant labor force, and harvested beets in Colorado, Nebraska, and Wyoming. When Huerta was young, she would hear her father tell stories about union organizing. After her parents divorced when she was three years old, she seldom saw her father. He stayed in New Mexico and served in the state legislature in 1938.

Chávez raised Huerta and her two brothers in the central California farmworker community of Stockton, California. Huerta's mother was known for her kindness and compassion towards others and was active in community affairs, numerous civic organizations, and the church. She encouraged the cultural diversity that was a natural part of Huerta's upbringing in Stockton. Alicia Chávez was a businesswoman who owned a restaurant and a 70-room hotel, where she welcomed low-wage workers and farmworker families at affordable prices and sometimes gave them free housing. Huerta was inspired by her mother to advocate for farmworkers later on in her life. In an interview, Huerta stated that "The dominant person in my life is my mother. She was a very intelligent woman and a very gentle woman". This prompted Huerta to think about civil rights. Her mother's generous actions during Dolores's childhood provided the foundation for her own non-violent, strongly spiritual stance. In the same interview she said, "When we talk about spiritual forces, I think that Hispanic women are more familiar with spiritual forces. We know what fasting is, and that it is part of the culture. We know what relationships are, and we know what sacrifice is".

Huerta's community activism began when she was a student at Stockton High School. Huerta was active in numerous school clubs and was a majorette and dedicated member of the Girl Scouts until the age of 18.

Dolores Huerta says a school teacher accusing her of stealing another student's work and, as a result, giving her an unfair grade, an act she considers to be rooted in racial bias. Having experienced marginalization during childhood because she was Hispanic, Huerta grew up with the belief that society needed to be changed. She attended college at the University of the Pacific's Stockton College (later to become San Joaquin Delta Community College), where she earned a provisional teaching credential. After teaching elementary school, Huerta left her job and began her lifelong crusade to correct economic injustice:

Career as an activist

In 1955, Huerta along with Fred Ross co-founded and organized the Stockton Chapter of the Community Service Organization (CSO), which fought for economic improvements for Latino/Mexican/Chicano migrant Farm workers. Due to her dedication and willingness to serve, Ross often delegated huge responsibilities to her. He knew she was capable of delivering the organization's message in Spanish and English and promoted the agenda from door to door field organizing. "As she assumed responsibilities and stance that were traditionally held by white males, Huerta encountered criticism based on both gender and ethnic stereotypes".

In 1960, Huerta co-founded the Agricultural Workers Association, which set up voter registration drives and pressed local governments for barrio improvements. In 1962, she co-founded, with César Chávez, the National Farm Workers Association, which would later become the United Agricultural Workers Organizing Committee. Huerta was the only woman to ever sit on the board of the UFW, until 2018. In 1966, she negotiated a contract between the UFWOC and Schenley Wine Company, marking the first time that farm workers were able to effectively bargain with an agricultural enterprise.

But Chavez and Huerta quickly realized that they shared a common goal of helping improve the lives and wages of farmworkers, so they co-founded the National Farm Workers Association. In 1962, after the CSO turned down Chávez's request, as their president, to organize farmworkers, Chávez and Huerta resigned from the CSO. She went to work for the National Farm Workers Association, which would later merge with the Agricultural Workers Organizing Committee to become the United Farm Workers Organizing Committee. "Dolores's organizing skills were essential to the growth of this budding organization." The Original UFW house is located in the city of Los Angeles.

At the age of only 25, Huerta was a lobbyist in Sacramento for the Stockton Community Service Organization and trained people to do grassroots organizing.

The foundation was later changed to an affiliated agricultural workers’ organization. In an interview, Huerta explained that she decided to join the organization after getting an inside look at the poverty farm workers lived in. She cited that they were being paid little to nothing, had no rights, slept on the floors, had wooden boxes as furniture and unclean water, lacked access to bathrooms, and worked from sunrise to sundown without breaks. Many of these workers would migrate to where the crops were in season, meaning their children did not have a proper education and would often work in the fields alongside their parents. She explained that many women were often sexually assaulted by the landowners but were in fear to speak up because their family needed a job. She accused landowners of expecting free labor and justifying it as “doing the farmworkers and the public a favor by giving these people a job."

In 1965, Huerta directed the UFW's national boycott during the Delano grape strike, taking the plight of the farm workers to the consumers. She led the organization of boycotts advocating for consumer rights. The boycott resulted in the entire California table grape industry signing a three-year collective bargaining agreement with the United Farm Workers in 1970.

In addition to organizing, Huerta has been active in lobbying for laws to improve the lives of farm workers. The laws that she supported included the following:
 1960 bill to permit Spanish-speaking people to take the California driver's examination in Spanish
 1962 legislation repealing the Bracero Program
 1963 legislation to extend the federal program, Aid to Families with Dependent Children (AFDC), to California farmworkers
 The 1975 California Agricultural Labor Relations Act

As an advocate for farmworkers' rights, Huerta has been arrested twenty-two times for participating in non-violent civil disobedience activities and strikes. She remains active in progressive causes, and serves on the boards of People for the American Way, Consumer Federation of California, and Feminist Majority Foundation.

On June 5, 1968, Huerta stood beside Robert F. Kennedy on the speaker's platform at the Ambassador Hotel in Los Angeles as he delivered a victory statement to his political supporters shortly after winning the California Democratic presidential primary election. Only moments after the candidate finished his speech, Kennedy and five other people were wounded by gunfire inside the hotel's kitchen pantry. Kennedy died from his gunshot wounds on June 6.

In September 1988, in front of the St. Francis Hotel in Union Square, Huerta was severely beaten by San Francisco Police officer Frank Achim during a peaceful and lawful protest of the policies/platform of then-candidate for president George H. W. Bush. The baton-beating caused significant internal injuries to her torso, resulting in several broken ribs and requiring the removal of her spleen in emergency surgery. The beating was caught on videotape and broadcast widely on local television news. Later, Huerta won a large judgment against the SFPD and the City of San Francisco for the attack, the proceeds of which she used for the benefit of farm workers. As a result of this assault and the suit, the SFPD was pressured to change its crowd control policies and its process of officer discipline.

Following a lengthy recovery, Huerta took a leave of absence from the union to focus on women's rights. She traversed the country for two years on behalf of the Feminist Majority's Feminization of Power: 50/50 by the year 2000 Campaign encouraging Latinas to run for office. The campaign resulted in a significant increase in the number of women representatives elected at the local, state and federal levels. She also served as National Chair of the 21st Century Party, founded in 1992 on the principles that women make up 52% of the party's candidates and that officers must reflect the ethnic diversity of the nation.

Dolores Huerta Foundation 
Huerta is president of the Dolores Huerta Foundation, which she founded in 2002. It is a 501(c)(3) "community benefit organization that organizes at the grassroots level, engaging and developing natural leaders. DHF creates leadership opportunities for community organizing, leadership development, civic engagement, and policy advocacy in the following priority areas: health & environment, education & youth development, and economic development."

The foundation first got started when Huerta received the $100,000 Puffin/Nation Prize for Creative Citizenship in 2002, which she then used to create the DHF. Her youngest daughter, Camila Chavez, is the Executive Director at the foundation. The primary purpose of the foundation is to weave in movements such as “women’s rights, LGBTQ rights, immigrant rights, labor rights, and civil rights” into an individual thread.

The DHF has several programs. The civic engagement program focuses on the voting rights of the people. They have protested, with petitions and signatures, to revise property tax loopholes in Proposition 13. Another part of their campaigns was to encourage voters to vote at the California primary elections, and to educate voters on federal issues such as the Tax Cuts and Jobs Act of 2017 and the White House Budget. They also created a Youth VOTE Campaign, where they were able to reach 1,055 contacts and 809 young voters. The organization has “secured millions of dollars for local infrastructures such as new sewer connections, street lights, sidewalks, and gutters in Lamont and Weedpatch from 2007-2015.” The DHF was one of the plaintiffs in a suit against Kern High School District, alleging that African-American and Latino students were unfairly targeted for disciplinary actions; as part of the settlement, the district provides Positive Behavioral Intervention and Supports training to staff members.

Awards and honors 

Dolores Huerta currently has about 15 honorary doctorates.

On November 17, 2015, Dolores Huerta was bestowed the Order of the Aztec Eagle, the highest decoration a foreign national can receive from the Mexican government. Huerta was lauded for her years of service helping the Mexican community in the United States fighting for equal pay, dignity in the workplace, and fair employment practices in the farms of Northern California like Stockton, Salinas, and Delano.

Huerta received the Presidential Medal of Freedom from President Barack Obama on May 29, 2012.

Huerta has served on the Board of Directors of Equality California.

Huerta was named one of the three most important women of the year in 1997 by Ms. magazine. She was an inaugural recipient of the Eleanor Roosevelt Award for Human Rights from President Bill Clinton in 1998. That same year, Ladies' Home Journal recognized her as one of the '100 Most Important Women of the 20th Century', along with such women leaders as Mother Teresa, Margaret Thatcher, Rosa Parks, and Indira Gandhi.

She was awarded the Puffin/Nation Prize for Creative Citizenship in 2002. She was conferred an honorary degree of Doctor of Humane Letters from California State University, Northridge on May 29, 2002. On September 30, 2005, she became an honorary sister of Kappa Delta Chi sorority (Alpha Alpha chapter – Wichita State University). She received an honorary degree from Princeton University in recognition of her numerous achievements May 2006. She was lauded in the ceremony: "Through her insatiable hunger of justice—La Causa—and her tireless advocacy, she has devoted her life to creative, compassionate, and committed citizenship." She was co-recipient (along with Virgilio Elizondo) of the 2007 Community of Christ International Peace Award .

On May 18, 2007, she announced her endorsement of Hillary Clinton for president, and at the 2008 Democratic National Convention, Huerta formally placed Clinton's name into nomination. Also in 2008, Huerta received the "Maggie" Award, highest honor of the Planned Parenthood Federation, in tribute to their founder, Margaret Sanger.

She was recognized in 2008 by United Neighborhood Centers of America with its highest individual honor, the Jane Addams Distinguished Leadership Award at its National Policy Summit in Washington, D.C. She was awarded the UCLA Medal, UCLA's highest honor, during the UCLA College of Letters and Science commencement ceremony on June 12, 2009.

In October 2010, Huerta was awarded an honorary degree by Mills College, who lauded her as "a lifetime champion of social justice whose courageous leadership garnered unprecedented national support from farmworkers, women, and underserved communities in a landmark quest for human and civil rights". The same month, she was awarded an honorary doctorate  by University of the Pacific, which unveiled an official portrait of her for the Architects of Peace Project by artist Michael Collopy.

Huerta was awarded an honorary doctorate of humane letters by Mount Holyoke College, where she delivered the commencement address, on May 21, 2017.

Huerta was honored by California State University, Los Angeles in October 2017 with its highest honor, the Presidential Medallion.

Four elementary schools in California and one in Tulsa, Oklahoma; one school in Fort Worth, Texas; and a high school in Pueblo, Colorado, are named after Huerta. Pitzer College, in Claremont, California has a mural in front of Holden Hall dedicated to her. A middle school in the major agricultural city of Salinas, California, which has a dense population of farm workers, was named in 2014 after her. She was a speaker at the first and tenth César Chávez Convocation. In 2013, Huerta received the annual Award for Greatest Public Service Benefiting the Disadvantaged, given by Jefferson Awards.

Huerta also gave the keynote address at the Berkeley Law Class of 2018 graduation ceremony.

In July 2018, California Governor Jerry Brown signed into law AB 2455, by Assemblymember Eloise Gómez Reyes, designating April 10 each year as Dolores Huerta Day. In March 2019, Washington Governor Jay Inslee signed a measure also designating April 10 each year as Dolores Huerta Day.

The intersection of East 1st and Chicago streets in the Los Angeles neighborhood of Boyle Heights is named Dolores Huerta Square. In Fort Worth, Texas, a portion of State Highway 183 is named in honor of Huerta.

Asteroid 6849 Doloreshuerta, discovered by American astronomers Eleanor Helin and Schelte Bus at Palomar Observatory in 1979, was named in her honor. The official  was published by the Minor Planet Center on August 27, 2019.

Huerta received the Ripple of Hope Award from the Robert F. Kennedy Center for Justice and Human Rights in 2020.

In March 2021, the Governing Board of the Burbank Unified School District in Burbank voted to rename its David Starr Jordan Middle School as the Dolores Huerta Middle School. Yale University awarded Huerta an Honorary Doctor of Laws in May, 2021. In August 2021, a brand new middle school in San Jose was dedicated in Huerta's honor.

She once served as Honorary Chair in Democratic Socialist of America.

Representation in other media
 Huerta is one of the subjects of the Sylvia Morales film A Crushing Love (2009), the sequel to Chicana (1979).
 She is portrayed by actress/activist Rosario Dawson in Diego Luna's César Chávez (2014).
 She is the focus of a 2017 documentary called Dolores.
 A middle school in Las Cruces, New Mexico is named after her. La Academia Dolores Huerta. The school specializes in bilingual studies, Latin dance and folk music.

Women's rights

Huerta championed women's rights in feminist campaigns during her time off from union work. She also fought for ethnic diversity in her campaigns.

Huerta was an honorary co-chair of the Women's March on Washington on January 21, 2017, the day after the inauguration of Donald Trump as president.

Dolores, a new documentary about Huerta, talks a lot about her feminist approach to activism. She defines a feminist person as someone "who supports a woman's reproductive rights, who supports a woman's right to an abortion, who supports LGBT rights, who supports workers and labor unions, somebody who cares about the environment, who cares about civil rights and equality and equity in terms of our economic system." Huerta goes on, in the documentary, to explain how she understands why many people think "feminism is for white women" and that is because middle-class women initially organized it. However, her stance is to show that women of color can be at the front of civil rights, labor, and feminist movements. When looking to the future of activism, Huerta believes that education is the way to go, stating: "We've got to include, from pre-K, the contributions of people of color in our schools today." She says this is the only way to erase the ignorance we have in the world right now.

Dolores Huerta and Gloria Steinem championed intersectionality in activism. In the 60's, when Huerta traveled to New York City for the Boycott of California Table Grapes, she was focused on bringing women to the fight. Said Huerta: “My mind was focused on getting those women at those conventions to support the farmworkers,". At the convention, Gloria Steinem voiced her support for Huerta's cause, which prompted Huerta to lend her support for the feminist movement. Huerta believes herself to be a “born again feminist”. By consciously incorporating feminism into her fight for workers’ rights, Huerta had more of an impact on how female workers were treated. Additionally, Steinem expanded the feminist movement to include issues surrounding race and feminism to show it was no longer a movement just for white women.

In the 1970s, Huerta’s positions on women’s rights were often moderated by the UFW’s messaging strategy, which involved portraying its workers as what Ana Raquel Minian describes as “idealized figure[s] of the physically disciplined resident/ laborer deserving of rights.” As a result, the union encouraged abstinence, discouraged homosexuality, and restricted the distribution of birth control to laborers. Huerta joined in criticizing workers for their perceived promiscuity; while she did not personally support the use of birth control, she kept this opinion to herself out of respect for other women’s choices.

In 2014, Dolores Huerta organized people in Colorado to vote against Amendment 67, which would have extended the definition of “person” and “child” in the Colorado Criminal Code and the Colorado Wrongful Death Act to include "unborn human beings", which could have restricted reproductive rights.

Huerta spent three decades advocating for safer working conditions with the UFW. A key part of her platform was reducing harmful pesticides. As her movement grew more feminist in nature, this became more important as such pesticides cause pregnancy complications such as: decreased fertilitity, spontaneous abortion, stillbirth, and developmental abnormalities.

Personal life
Huerta married Ralph Head in college after her graduation in 1948. During their marriage, they had two daughters, Celeste and Lori.

After divorcing Head, she married Ventura Huerta, with whom she bore five children. Their son Emilio Jesus Huerta entered politics and ran for Congress. Her second marriage ended in divorce as well, in part because of the significant amount of time that she spent away from the family while campaigning and organizing.

Later, Huerta had a romantic relationship with Richard Chavez, the brother of César Chávez. Huerta and Chávez never married, but the couple had four children during their relationship. Richard Chávez died on July 27, 2011.

Archival collection
The Dolores Huerta Papers are a part of the United Farm Workers Collections at the Walter P. Reuther Library. There is also significant material related to Huerta in the Cesar Chávez Papers at the Reuther Library.

See also

 Cesar Chavez
Larry Itliong
Philip Vera Cruz
Mily Treviño-Sauceda
List of civil rights leaders
 History of Mexican Americans
 List of Mexican Americans
 List of Presidential Medal of Freedom recipients
 National Organization for Women Woman of Courage Award winners
 List of Mills College honorary degree recipients
 List of people from Stockton, California
 List of Scouts

References

Further reading
 Amsler, T. R. (Summer 2007). "'Si, Se Puede': Hayward teachers gain concessions and a valuable ally". Rethinking Schools, 21(4), 11.
 Felner, J. (Jan/Feb 1998). "Dolores Huerta". Ms, 8(4), 48–49.
 
 Huerta, D. (Spring 2007). "One more child left behind". Ms, 17(2), 79.
 Perez, F (1996). Dolores Huerta. Austin, TX: Raintree.
 Rose, M. (2004). "Dolores Huerta: The United Farm Workers Union". In Arnesen, E (Ed.). Human tradition in American labor history. (pp. 211–229). Wilmington, DE: Scholarly Resources Inc.
 Rosenburg, R. (Editor & Director) (1996). Women of hope [Videocassette]. Princeton, NJ: Films for the Humanities.
 Schiff, K. G. (2005). Lighting the way: Nine women who changed modern America. New York: Hyperion.
 Telles, R & Tejada-Flores, R. (Directors) (1997). Fight in the fields [videocassette]. San Francisco: Paradigm Productions.
 Vogel, N. (September 7, 2005). "Legislature OKs gay marriage; Assembly action sends the bill to the governor, who has signaled that he will veto the measure". Los Angeles Times, p. A1.

External links

 Dolores Huerta Foundation
 Dolores Huerta Celebrates 80th Birthday with Call for "Weaving Movements Together" – video report by Democracy Now!
 Biography at Las Culturas
 Michals, Debra.  "Dolores Huerta".  National Women's History Museum. 2015.
 
 Equality California

Cesar Chavez
United Farm Workers people
American trade union leaders
Activists for Hispanic and Latino American civil rights
American feminists
Labor relations in California
Presidential Medal of Freedom recipients
Members of the Democratic Socialists of America
People for the American Way people
University of the Pacific (United States) alumni
American trade unionists of Mexican descent
People from Colfax County, New Mexico
People from Stockton, California
1930 births
Living people
Trade unionists from California
Trade unionists from New Mexico
Recipients of the Four Freedoms Award
American women trade unionists